Doodlebug or doodle bug may refer to:

Animals
Cockchafer or doodlebug, a European beetle
Woodlouse or doodlebug
Armadillidiidae or doodlebug, a family of woodlice
Doodlebugs, the larvae of antlions, a group of species of insect.

Film
Doodlebug, a 1997 short film
Caroline "Doodlebug" Bichon, a character in the 1995 film Something to Talk About
Doodlebug Simkins, a character in the 1975 film Cleopatra Jones

Transportation

Aircraft
 V-1 flying bomb or the Doodlebug
 Flylight Doodle Bug, a British powered hang glider
 Heuberger Doodle Bug, an American home-built aircraft
 McDonnell Doodlebug, a 1920s light aircraft

Rail and road
Doodlebug (rail car), a self-propelled railroad vehicle
Doodle Bug scooter, a 1950s motor scooter 
Doodlebug tractor, an American World War II home-built tractor
Texaco Doodlebug, a 1930s tanker truck
Brogan Doodlebug, a 1944 tiny car

Other uses
Dowsing or doodlebugging
Reflection seismology data collection or doodlebugging

Animal common name disambiguation pages

ja:ドゥードゥルバグ